Luiz Carlos Caetano de Azevedo Junior, better known as Junior or Luiz Junior (born April 23, 1990), is a Brazilian footballer who plays as a striker for Bangladesh Premier League club Fortis FC. He was born in Niterói.

Club career 
He first played in Indonesian football competitions with PS Barito Putera in 2016 season.

Botafogo 
While at Botafogo, Junior played against a teenage Neymar during his debut season at Santos.

Madura United 
Junior signed for Madura United for the 2017 Indonesia Super League.

Persija Jakarta 
Junior signed for the capital club on loan from Madura United but was officially released by Persija Jakarta at the end of the first round of League 1 2017. The capital club was not satisfied with Luis's performance, who only scored three goals in the 15 games he played. However, he was not welcomed back at his parent club as they already had all of their foreign signing slots filled.

Sabah FA 
Junior signed for Malaysian side Sabah FA for the 2019 Malaysia Premier League season but was released in May after scoring 4 goals.

Tanjong Pagar United 
Junior signed for Tanjong Pagar United for the 2020 Singapore Premier League season. The Jaguars' Head Coach Hairi Su'ap said it took less than five minutes of footage for him to be sold on Junior, who played for Sabah FA last year.

Club career statistics
As of 2 Oct 2021

International career
In 2007, Junior was part of Brazil's team for the Under-17 World Cup in South Korea, scoring in the group stage against New Zealand, before the team were knocked out in the last 16 by fourth-placed Ghana. Junior was also named in Brazil's squad for the 2007 Pan American Games, and he scored a goal in the group stage, but lost 2-4 against Colombia.

He also progressed to Brazil's Under-20s, where he played alongside former Chelsea playmaker Oscar and Juventus left-back Alex Sandro.

Honours
Botafogo
Campeonato Carioca: 2010

References

External links
 ogol.com
 soccerway

1990 births
Living people
Brazilian footballers
Brazilian expatriate footballers
Botafogo de Futebol e Regatas players
Duque de Caxias Futebol Clube players
Bangu Atlético Clube players
Expatriate footballers in Greece
Madura United F.C. players
Expatriate footballers in Indonesia
Brazilian expatriate sportspeople in Indonesia
Liga 1 (Indonesia) players
Sabah F.C. (Malaysia) players
Association football forwards
Brazilian expatriate sportspeople in Greece
Clube Náutico Marcílio Dias players
PS Barito Putera players
Persija Jakarta players
Brazilian expatriate sportspeople in Jordan
Expatriate footballers in Jordan
Expatriate footballers in Oman
Brazilian expatriate sportspeople in Oman
Expatriate footballers in Egypt
Brazilian expatriate sportspeople in Egypt
Al Mokawloon Al Arab SC players
Expatriate footballers in Malaysia
Brazilian expatriate sportspeople in Malaysia
Tanjong Pagar United FC players
Expatriate footballers in Singapore
Brazilian expatriate sportspeople in Singapore
Sportspeople from Niterói